Samuel Roy-Bois (born September 30, 1973) is a Quebecois artist, musician, and performer. Roy-Bois is interested in the deconstruction of space, questioning and redefining the boundaries between art and exhibition spaces.

In 2001, he received his MFA from Concordia University, Roy-Bois lives in Vancouver, British Columbia, Canada and is an assistant professor of visual art at the University of British Columbia Okanagan Campus in Kelowna.

Exhibitions
 2015 Œil de Poisson, Quebec City, 2015.
 2010 "Candid" at Republic Gallery.
 2008 Contemporary Art Gallery, Vancouver.  
 2006 Improbable and Ridiculous at the Musée d'art contemporain de Montréal, Montreal.
 2003 Or Gallery, Vancouver.

References

External links
Official web site

1973 births
Living people
Artists from Quebec